Anita Chapman MBE (born 3 July 1952 in Doncaster) is a British Paralympic archer who won medals at four Paralympics.

Career
In individual medals she won silver at the 1996 Summer Paralympics she joined Kathleen Smith and Rebecca Gale to gain a bronze medal for the UK in the women's archery team open. This was better than 1992 when the UK had won no medals.

Chapman won gold at the 2000 Summer Paralympics. In team medals she was on the bronze medal team at the 1996 Summer Paralympics, the silver medalist team at the 2000 Summer Paralympics, and the gold medal-winning team at the 2004 Summer Paralympics.

Chapman was appointed Member of the Order of the British Empire (MBE) in the 2003 New Year Honours for services to Archery.

References

External links 
 

1952 births
Living people
English female archers
Paralympic archers of Great Britain
Paralympic gold medalists for Great Britain
Paralympic silver medalists for Great Britain
Paralympic bronze medalists for Great Britain
Paralympic medalists in archery
Archers at the 1996 Summer Paralympics
Archers at the 2000 Summer Paralympics
Archers at the 2004 Summer Paralympics
Medalists at the 1996 Summer Paralympics
Medalists at the 2000 Summer Paralympics
Medalists at the 2004 Summer Paralympics
Members of the Order of the British Empire
Sportspeople from Doncaster